Dmitri Ravilevich Pereverzev (born 10 January 1998) is a Russian football player who plays for FC Spartak Kostroma.

Club career
He made his debut in the Russian Professional Football League for FC Salyut Belgorod on 6 April 2019 in a game against FC Ryazan.

He made his Russian Football National League debut for FC Armavir on 9 July 2019 in a game against FC Krasnodar-2.

References

External links
 Profile by Russian Professional Football League
 
 

1998 births
People from Oboyansky District
Sportspeople from Kursk Oblast
Living people
Russian footballers
Association football midfielders
FC Salyut Belgorod players
FC Armavir players
FC Avangard Kursk players
FC Spartak Kostroma players
Russian First League players
Russian Second League players